Austin Ryan Kearns (born May 20, 1980) is an American former professional baseball outfielder. He played in Major League Baseball (MLB) from 2002 through 2013 for the Cincinnati Reds, Washington Nationals, Cleveland Indians, New York Yankees, and Miami Marlins.

Baseball career

Cincinnati Reds
After playing at Lafayette Senior High School, he was offered a scholarship to play college baseball at the University of Florida. However, he decided to sign with the Cincinnati Reds after being selected seventh overall in the 1998 Major League Baseball Draft. After three seasons in the Reds' minor league system, he made his Major League debut on April 17, 2002.

Washington Nationals

Kearns was traded to the Nationals on July 13, 2006, along with Felipe Lopez and Ryan Wagner from the Cincinnati Reds in exchange for Gary Majewski, Bill Bray, Royce Clayton, Brendan Harris, and Daryl Thompson.

On September 23, 2006, playing against the New York Mets at Shea Stadium, Kearns and first baseman Nick Johnson collided while making a sliding attempt to catch a fly ball. Kearns originally remained in the game relatively unhurt, but was removed shortly after play resumed by Manager Frank Robinson. Kearns was replaced by Ryan Church, who played in Kearns' spot for most of the rest of the season. Kearns suffered severe bruising down his left side as well as soreness. Johnson sustained a broken femur and underwent surgery that night to repair his injuries. Johnson missed all of 2007 recuperating from his injuries. Kearns, however, had career highs in several key areas, including 161 games played and 74 RBIs. On May 12, 2007, in a game at home against the Florida Marlins, Kearns hit a bases-empty inside-the-park home run, the first ever for a Nationals player. The ball bounced off the glove of Florida Marlins player Reggie Abercrombie. Kearns scored after receiving the sign to keep  running by 3rd base coach Tim Tollman. Down the stretch, he tallied 4 hits in 11 at bats (with 2 home runs) in a late-season Nats' series sweep over the division leading New York Mets that kept the Mets out of the playoffs.

In 2008, the Nationals placed Kearns on the 15-day disabled list on May 22 because of loose bodies in his right elbow and on August 25 with a stress fracture in his left foot.

Kearns was placed on the disabled list on August 5, 2009 with a right thumb injury. His move to the list was retroactive to August 4. The Nationals called up outfielder Jorge Padilla from the Triple-A Syracuse Chiefs to replace the ailing Kearns. On November 6, the Nationals declined the 2010 contract option on Kearns making him a free agent.

Cleveland Indians

On January 5, 2010, Kearns signed a minor league contract with the Cleveland Indians with an invite to spring training. He was added to the Major League roster on April 3. On July 5, 2010, vs. the Texas Rangers, Kearns was hit by a pitch three times. This set a new all time Indians record and tied the Major League record for most hits by pitch. The last player to do so was Manny Ramirez on the same date in 2008.

New York Yankees
On July 30, 2010, Kearns was traded to the New York Yankees for a player to be named later, later revealed to be Zach McAllister. Kearns was part of the Yankees 2010 postseason roster until the team lost to the Texas Rangers in the 2010 ALCS.

Second stint with Cleveland

On December 20, 2010, Kearns signed a one-year deal with the Cleveland Indians. He was designated for assignment on August 12, 2011 to make room on the active roster for the return of Shin-Soo Choo from the disabled list. Kearns was released on August 17.

Miami Marlins
Kearns signed a minor league contract with the Miami Marlins on January 25, 2012. He also received an invitation to spring training and would later make the Opening Day roster.

On May 23, 2012, The Marlins placed Kearns on a 15-day Disabled List after he strained his right hamstring. He was reinstated on June 7. In 2012, he hit .245 with 6 doubles, no triples, 4 home runs, 16 RBI, 22 walks, and 2 stolen bases in 147 at bats.

In 2013, Kearns was batting .185 through 19 games before he was placed on the Bereavement List by the Marlins.  After seven games, having not returned to the team, he was transferred to the restricted list.

References

External links

1980 births
Living people
Cincinnati Reds players
Washington Nationals players
Cleveland Indians players
New York Yankees players
Miami Marlins players
Baseball players from Lexington, Kentucky
Major League Baseball right fielders
Billings Mustangs players
Rockford Reds players
Dayton Dragons players
Gulf Coast Reds players
Chattanooga Lookouts players
Louisville Bats players
Hagerstown Suns players
Columbus Clippers players
Jupiter Hammerheads players